The Battle of Seven Oaks was a violent confrontation in the Pemmican War between the Hudson's Bay Company (HBC) and the North West Company (NWC), rivals in the fur trade, that took place on 19 June 1816, the climax of a long dispute in western Canada. The Métis people fought for the North West Company, and they called it "the Victory of Frog Plain" (la Victoire de la Grenouillère).

Background
Miles MacDonell was the governor of the Red River Colony in 1814, the area around Winnipeg, Manitoba. He issued the Pemmican Proclamation which prohibited export of pemmican from the colony for the next year. It was meant to guarantee adequate supplies for the Hudson's Bay Colony, but the North West Company viewed it as a ploy by the Earl of Selkirk to monopolize the commodity, which was important to the North West Company. The Métis did not acknowledge the authority of the Red River Settlement, and the Pemmican Proclamation was a blow to both the Métis and North West Company. The North West Company accused the HBC of unfairly monopolizing the fur trade.

MacDonnell resigned as governor of the Red River Colony in 1815, after several conflicts and suffering from "severe emotional instability." He was replaced by Robert Semple, an American businessman with no previous experience in the fur trade.

Battle

Cuthbert Grant led a group of North West Company employees in 1816 to seize a supply of pemmican from the Hudson's Bay Company that had been stolen from the Métis.

Grant's group encountered Semple and a group of HBC men and settlers north of Fort Douglas along the Red River at a location known as Seven Oaks, which the Métis called la Grenouillière (Frog Plain). The North West Company sent François-Firmin Boucher to speak to Semple's men. He and Semple argued, and a gunfight ensued when the settlers tried to arrest Boucher and seize his horse. Early reports said that the Métis fired the first shot and began the fray, but Royal Commissioner William Bachelor Coltman determined with "next to certainty" that it was one of Semple's men who fired first. The Métis were skilled sharpshooters and outnumbered Semple's forces by nearly 3 to 1.  The Metis killed 21 men, including Governor Semple, while suffering only one fatality.

Aftermath

The settlers were demoralized from the losses, so they gathered their belongings the day after the battle and sailed north, leaving the Métis in command of the settlement. Royal Commissioner W. B. Coltman investigated the incident, and he exonerated the Métis. Lord Selkirk attempted to prosecute several members of the North West Company for murder and kept Boucher in prison for nearly two years without specific charges. All trials ended in acquittals, and the remaining charges were dropped. Members of the North West Company counter-sued Selkirk, whose health and influence subsequently declined. Selkirk died in 1820, and the two companies merged in 1821. The Hudson's Bay Company gave Cuthbert Grant an annual salary in 1828 and the position of "warden of the plains of Red River".

The Manitoba Historical Society erected an obelisk monument in 1891 commemorating the battle at the intersection of Main Street and Rupertsland Boulevard in the Winnipeg district of West Kildonan, the approximate centre of the battle site. The site was designated a National Historic Site of Canada in 1920. Parks Canada installed new interpretive signs as part of their reconciliation with the Métis, and the Seven Oaks Park was re-landscaped. The site was officially reopened on 19 June 2016 to mark the 200th anniversary of the battle.

References

Further reading
 
 Dick, Lyle. "The Seven Oaks Incident and the Construction of a Historical Tradition, 1816 to 1970." Journal of the Canadian Historical Association/Revue de la Société historique du Canada 2.1 (1991): 91-113. online

External links

Conflicts in 1816
Battles involving Canada
Conflicts in Canada
Military history of Manitoba
North West Company
Hudson's Bay Company
Battles involving the Métis
Economic warfare
1816 in Canada
June 1816 events
Pemmican War
Indigenous conflicts in Canada